The Raincloud Man is a Big Finish Productions audio drama based on the long-running British science fiction television series Doctor Who.

Plot
The Doctor and Charley return to Manchester and discover its complicated link to transient aliens.

Cast
The Doctor — Colin Baker
Charley Pollard – India Fisher
D.I. Patricia Menzies – Anna Hope
Brooks – Michael Fenton Stevens
Lish – Aidan J David
Carmen – Octavia Walters
Kelsa – Simon Sherlock
Tabbalac Leader – Jeremy James
The Bouncers – Steven Hansell
The Cyrox – Andrew Dickens

Notes
Anna Hope previously appeared as Novice Hame in the television episodes "New Earth" and "Gridlock".
Writer Douglas Adams (a former script editor of the classic TV series) has his most famous story The Hitchhiker's Guide to the Galaxy directly mentioned in this play.  The phrase "interconnectedness of all things" spoken in this audio story is a quote repeatedly used in Adams' Dirk Gently novels.  The character of the Raincloud Man may have been inspired by the character of the Rain God from Adams' novel So Long and Thanks for All the Fish.
The high-stakes gambling at the end of the adventure is the British card game Top Trumps.

Continuity
D.I. Menzies previously appeared in The Condemned.  She returns in The Crimes of Thomas Brewster, where she meets the Doctor at an earlier point in his life and must pretend to be a stranger to him.
Mention is made of an etheric-beam locator.  One was seen in Genesis of the Daleks.  The Master was also fitted with a pair by the Daleks in Doctor Who and the Curse of Fatal Death.

External links
The Raincloud Man

2008 audio plays
Sixth Doctor audio plays
Manchester in fiction
Fiction set in 2008